Archibald McDonald Longmuir (17 April 1897 –) was a Scottish professional football who played as a winger. He made professional appearances for Celtic, Blackburn Rovers, Oldham Athletic and Wrexham. At Wrexham, he made over 200 league appearances for the club.

References

1897 births
Date of death unknown
Scottish footballers
Association football forwards
English Football League players
Ardrossan Winton Rovers F.C. players
Celtic F.C. players
Blackburn Rovers F.C. players
Oldham Athletic A.F.C. players
Wrexham A.F.C. players
Cowdenbeath F.C. players